Justin Kuritzkes is an American playwright and novelist. In 2016 his play The Sensuality Party toured the university circuit of New York state. He has been the subject of media coverage because of his activities on YouTube, such as the 2011 video "Potion Seller",  which inspired parodies in publications including The New Yorker. In 2019 he released the novel Famous People.

Kuritzkes wrote the script for the upcoming romantic sports-comedy Challengers, helmed by Luca Guadagnino and starring Zendaya, Josh O’Connor, and Mike Faist.

References

Year of birth missing (living people)
Living people
21st-century American novelists
American YouTubers
21st-century American dramatists and playwrights
American male dramatists and playwrights
American male novelists
21st-century American male writers